The 2022 Vuelta a Murcia was the 42nd edition of the Vuelta a Murcia road cycling race. It was held on 12 February 2022 in the titular region of southeastern Spain as a category 1.1 event on the 2022 UCI Europe Tour calendar.

It was won by Italian rider Alessandro Covi, finishing one second ahead of the peloton after a 5 kilometer solo. Covi's teammate and fellow Italian Matteo Trentin won the sprint for second, followed by French rider Matis Louvel coming in third.

Teams 
Seven UCI WorldTeams, eleven UCI ProTeams, and two UCI Continental teams made up the twenty teams that participated in the race. Fifteen teams each fielded seven riders, which was the maximum allowed, while four teams each fielded six, and one team only fielded five. Of the 134 riders to start the race, 113 finished.

UCI WorldTeams

 
 
 
 
 
 
 

UCI ProTeams

 
 
 
 
 
 
 
 
 
 
 

UCI Continental Teams

Results

References 

2022
Vuelta a Murcia
Vuelta a Murcia
Vuelta a Murcia